Andreas Tiffner (born 10 February 1991) is an Austrian professional footballer who plays in Austria for SK Austria Klagenfurt (2007). He plays as a striker.

Tiffner has represented his native Austria at Under-17 level. Tiffner represented the Austria U-17 team for their unsuccessful 2008 UEFA European Under-17 Football Championship qualifying round campaign.

External links

1991 births
Living people
Austrian footballers
Austria youth international footballers
Austria under-21 international footballers
Association football forwards
FK Austria Wien players
Austrian Football Bundesliga players
First Vienna FC players
Wiener Sport-Club players
People from Feldkirchen in Kärnten
Footballers from Carinthia (state)